Botswana Fibre Networks (BOFINET) is the wholesale provider of national and international telecommunication infrastructure in Botswana formed in 2012 to focus on and improve the backbone network and internet infrastructure of Botswana.

History 
Botswana Fibre Networks was formed in 2012 when the Government of Botswana repealed the Botswana Telecommunications Corporation Act to open the market to competition and as they were preparing BTC for initial public offering and to break its monopoly. As a result, the government established Botswana Fibre Networks (BoFiNet) to manage and operate long-distance transmission networks and become a provider to BTC, Mascom, Verbosec, Orange Botswana and other internet service providers. Some of BTC assets were transferred to BoFiNet to enable it to deliver on its mandate. BTC investment in EASSy and West Africa Cable System was transferred to Botswana Fibre Networks as part of the transition.

See also 

 Botswana Telecommunications Corporation
 Mascom
 Botswana Communications Regulatory Authority

References

External links 

 Official website

Internet service providers of Botswana
Telecommunications companies of Botswana